Kevin Lilliana Junaedy (born 5 January 1996) is a presenter, interior designer, and beauty pageant titleholder who was crowned Miss International 2017. She is the first Indonesian and the first Muslim women to win Miss International, and was the first to win one of the four major international pageants for Indonesia. Prior to winning Miss International, she was previously crowned as Puteri Indonesia Lingkungan 2017.

Early life and career 
Lilliana was born on 5 January 1996 in Bandung, to a Chinese-Indonesian father Eddie Foe Junaedy and Sundanese mother, Lina Yulianti. Lilliana is the eldest of two siblings. Graduated in 2017, She holds a bachelor degree in interior design from the Faculty of Arts and Design of Maranatha Christian University, a private university in Bandung – West Java.

Outside of pageantry, Lilliana works as a TV Presenter and Interior Designer.

On February 2, 2020, Lilliana married Oskar Mahendra, a singer and entertainment producer. Their wedding ceremony was carried in the traditional Sundanese theme. Mahendra is ten years older than Lilliana, and has a daughter from a previous relationship. On 21 October 2020, she gave birth to her only daughter, Seraphine Zaylina Mahendra.

Pageantry

Puteri Indonesia West Java 2017 
At age of 21, Lilliana joined provincial level competition of Puteri Indonesia West Java 2017, and won.

Puteri Indonesia 2017 
Lilliana competed in Puteri Indonesia 2017, representing the province of West Java. During finals night on March 31, 2017 held in Jakarta Convention Center, she won the title of Puteri Indonesia Lingkungan, in addition she also winning "Best Traditional Costume" and being "1st runner-up for Miss Talent" award.

Miss International 2017 
As Puteri Indonesia Lingkungan 2017, Lilliana represented Indonesia in Miss International 2017, held in the Tokyo Dome City Hall in Tokyo, Japan on November 14, 2017, and was crowned at the end of the competition by her predecessor, Miss International 2016 Kylie Fausto Verzosa from the Philippines.

Beside winning the crown, she is also manage to won the "Miss Best Dresser" special award. She wore a national costume called "Mbok Jamu Gendong and the Ancient Secret Potion" inspired by Indonesia's traditional herbal-medicine Jamu. Her achievement also marked Indonesia's first win at one of the famed Big Four international beauty pageants.

During the final round of speech portion of the pageant, each finalist were given a chance to express their plans if crowned Miss International and share their personal advocacies. Lilliana's speech read:

In her capacity as Miss International, Lilliana has traveled to Australia, New Zealand, China, Hong Kong, Macau, Malaysia, Singapore. Myanmar, Vietnam, Thailand, various cities within Japan, and her home country of Indonesia. On November 9, 2018, she crowned her successor Mariem Velazco from Venezuela as Miss International 2018 in Tokyo, Japan. She finished her reign at 11 months, 3 weeks, and 5 days.

Gallery

References

Living people
1996 births
Miss International 2017 delegates
Miss International winners
Puteri Indonesia contestants
Puteri Indonesia winners
Sundanese people
Indonesian beauty pageant winners
Indonesian people of Chinese descent
Indonesian activists
Indonesian Muslims
People from Bandung